Christopher John Thomason (born December 6, 1982) is an American model and actor. He is best known for his role as Jimmy Mance in the 2009 television series Harper's Island and his subsequent roles in horror films.

Early life 
Thomason was born in Abilene, Texas. After graduating in 2001, he moved to Los Angeles to begin his acting career.

Career 
Thomason had recurring roles in the television shows For The People and General Hospital, and he guest starred in Boston Public, CSI: NY and What About Brian. Thomason starred in Harper's Island in the role of Jimmy Mance and the horror films Husk (2011), The Monkey's Paw (2013) and Aftermath.

Filmography

Film

Television

Theatre 
This Is Theatre This Is Film
Bridge To Terabithia
Death Of A Salesman
Lil' Abner
It Runs In The Family
With A Glass Of Water

References

External links 
 

1982 births
Male actors from Texas
American male film actors
American male stage actors
American male television actors
People from Abilene, Texas
Living people